Ramón Rodríguez Jiménez (born 13 September 1999), commonly known as Monchu, is a Spanish professional footballer who plays as a midfielder for La Liga club Valladolid.

Career

Barcelona
Born in Palma, Majorca, Balearic Islands, Monchu joined FC Barcelona's youth setup in 2012, from RCD Mallorca. After progressing through the youth setup, he made his senior debut with the reserves on 15 December 2017, coming on as a second-half substitute for Oriol Busquets in a 3–1 away loss against Cádiz CF in the Segunda División. 

Monchu made his first team debut on 8 August 2020, coming off the bench in the UEFA Champions League round of 16 second leg against SSC Napoli.

Loan to Girona
On 22 September 2020, Monchu joined Girona FC in the second division on loan for the season, with a buyout clause. He scored his first goal for Girona the following 18 October in a 1–0 home victory against Real Oviedo.

Granada
On 16 July 2021, Granada CF announced the singing of Monchu from Barcelona on a free transfer, with Barça reserving a right to 50% of any future sale and a buy-back option. He made his top tier debut on 16 August, starting in a 0–0 away draw against Villarreal CF.

Loan to Valladolid
On 1 February 2022, Monchu was loaned to Real Valladolid in the second division, for the remainder of the season.

Career statistics

Honours
Barcelona
UEFA Youth League: 2017–18

References

External links

1999 births
Living people
Footballers from Palma de Mallorca
Spanish footballers
Association football midfielders
Segunda División players
Segunda División B players
La Liga players
FC Barcelona Atlètic players
FC Barcelona players
Girona FC players
Granada CF footballers
Real Valladolid players